Take Your Skin Off is the second album by the noise rock band Mindflayer.

Track listing
"Take Your Shoes Off" – 2:20
"Head of State on a Plate Levitation" – 4:10
"Drop Bass Not Bombs Leviathin" – 2:47
"Awind War III" – 1:51
"Everyone Dies (We Won Anyways), Pt. 2" – 6:09
"Are You Fucked Up" – 1:42
"Gold Lake Spiller" – 3:36
"Bubble Trouble Lem in No Proble" – 0:58
"Cat Kid's Dance Troupe" – 3:24
"I Fell into a Pool of Crawling Chaos" – 2:25
"Street Attack with Mongrels, Elephants, Glitter, Etc" – 1:57
"Swallowed by the Earth" – 3:43
"Spit Out by the Earth Wind Skin" – 3:08
"You're Dead at the Bottom of a Dungeon, Deal With It (Medeley)" – 21:08

References

2003 albums
Mindflayer (band) albums